Lyngby Boldklub (Danish pronunciation: [ˈlyːŋby]) is a professional Danish football club founded in 1921. It is based at Lyngby Stadion in Kongens Lyngby, Denmark.During the 2016/17 campaign they will be competing in the following competitions:Superliga, DBU Pokalen.

Competitions

Results summary

Results by matchday

Matches

External links
 Official website
 Official fansite

Lyngby Boldklub
Lyngby Boldklub